Calais-Dover is a 1931 French-German comedy film directed by Jean Boyer and Anatole Litvak and starring Lilian Harvey, André Roanne and Armand Bernard. It is the French-language version of the German film No More Love, with Harvey reprising her role. The title refers to the Dover–Calais ferry. It incorporated location shooting on the French Riviera with interiors shot at the Babelsberg Studios in Berlin. The film's sets were designed by the art directors Robert Herlth, Walter Röhrig and Werner Schlichting.

Cast

References

Bibliography

External links 
 

1931 films
German comedy films
1931 comedy films
1930s French-language films
Films directed by Jean Boyer
Films directed by Anatole Litvak
UFA GmbH films
German multilingual films
French multilingual films
German black-and-white films
French black-and-white films
French comedy films
1931 multilingual films
1930s German films
1930s French films
Films shot at Babelsberg Studios
Films set in France
Films shot in France